Cuncolim is a town in South Goa district in the state of Goa, India.

Geography

History
It is a former village, now with a municipal council of its own, in the south Goa sub-district (taluka) of Salcette, India. It is part of the AVC (Assolna-Velim-Cuncolim) network of villages.

Historically, there are twelve Vangodds (clans) of Ganvkars (landlords) in the village. Their names, in order of precedence, are as follows: Mhal, Shetcar, Naik, Mangro, Shet, Tombddo, Porob, Sidakalo, Lokakalo, Bandekar, Rounom and Becklo.

Cuncolim was the site of the Cuncolim revolt in 1583. Those killed on the Christian side included five Jesuits who were later beatified as the "Martyrs of Cuncolim".

The village of Cuncolim was the original site of the famous temple of Shree Shantadurga before almost all the villagers converted to Christianity and the temple was demolished. The few remaining Hindu families took the idol of Shree Shantadurga to Fatorpa where the new temple of Shree Shantadurga Cuncolikarin stands today.

Demographics 
Cuncolim has population of 16,623 (7,924 males,  8,699 females) with 50.42% being Hindu, 37.58% Christian, and 11.82% Muslim as per reports released by India’s Population Census 2011. Other religious minorities are present in trace numbers.

The village’s native Christian community consists of Goan Catholics originating from Kshatriya noblemen, known as Chardo, presently numbering 3000. 

Cuncolim also houses a Scheduled Tribe community of 738 and a Scheduled Caste population of 157 individuals as per Population Census 2011.

Education
It has 5 high schools namely Our Lady of Health, Cuncolim United, Infant Jesus, Maria Bambina Convent and St. Anthony High School (formerly known as Hutatma Rajanikant Kenkre Memorial High School). Higher secondary needs are catered to by Maria Bambina and United Higher secondary, former has Arts and Commerce stream whereas latter has both the streams in addition to Science. Cuncolim United College is the only college in Cuncolim which mostly has students from areas surrounding Cuncolim and also there is Graduation College namely Cuncolim Education Society of Arts and Commerce which provides Degree Course of B. A and B. COM for students of Cuncolim and surrounding areas . Prabal's Institute of Commerce and Computer Education has been imparting typing and computer skills for the last 25 years.

The permanent campus if National Institute of Technology, Goa will be at Cuncolim.

Culture
Cuncolim has a unique traditional village irrigation, involving 12 bunds (water-gathering centres). It has also 12 residential clans (or vangodds). Cuncolim Union is one of the social organisations formed by people of this area.

Government and politics
Cuncolim is part of Cuncolim (Goa Assembly constituency) and South Goa (Lok Sabha constituency).

Places of interest
Cuncolim is home to the Molanguinim Cave, small waterfalls and the Nayaband Lake.

See also 
 Cuncolim Revolt

References

External links
Cuncolim on GoaHolidayHomes.com

Cities and towns in South Goa district